Chamovo is a rural locality (a village) in Shidrovskoye Rural Settlement of Vinogradovsky District, Arkhangelsk Oblast, Russia. The population was 40 as of 2010.

Geography 
Chamovo is located on the Severnaya Dvina River, 39 km southeast of Bereznik (the district's administrative centre) by road.

References 

Rural localities in Vinogradovsky District